Andre Ward vs. Arthur Abraham was a Super Middleweight championship fight for the WBA Middleweight championship. The bout was held on May 14, 2011, at Home Depot Center, in Carson, California and was televised on Showtime. In the co-featured non-televised portion of the card, heavyweight world contender Cristobal Arreola took on Nagy Aguilera of the Dominican Republic.

Referee and Judges
The referee for the fight was Luis Pabon, and the judges were Stanley Christodoulou, Ingo Barrabas, and James Jen-Kin. Luis Pabon had previously been referee for the fight   Amir Khan vs. Paul McCloskey fight in April 2011.

Build Up

Andre Ward
Ward defeated Mikkel Kessler on November 21, 2009 for his WBA Super Middleweight Championship in his first of the Super Six World Boxing Classic. After, Jermain Taylor announced his exit from the Tournament. Allan Green was selected as his replacement and challenged the WBA Super Middleweight champion. Ward defeated Green by a shutout unanimous decision on June 19, 2010.

Arthur Abraham
In his first match of the tournament he faced Jermain Taylor in October 2009 at Berlin, Germany defeating him via knockout in the 12th round. He then lost his next fight by disqualification due to hitting Andre Dirrell while he was down in the 11th round. He then lost to Carl Froch for the vacant WBC Super-Middleweight title in his third fight of the tournament, losing by a shutout unanimous decision.

Main card
 Super Middleweight Championship bout:   Andre Ward vs.  Arthur Abraham
Ward defeated Abraham via unanimous decision (120–108, 118–110, 118–111).
 Heavyweight bout:  Chris Arreola vs.  Nagy Aguilera
Arreola defeated Aguilera via technical knockout at 1:58 in the third round.
 Heavyweight bout:  Manuel Quezada vs.  Bowie Tupou
Tupou defeated Quezada via knockout at 0:53 in the seventh round.

Preliminary card
 Middleweight bout:   Dominik Britsch vs.  Ryan Davis
Britsch defeated Davis via technical knockout at 2:22 in the fifth round.
 Super Middleweight bout:   Shawn Estrada vs.  Byron Tyson
Estrada defeated Tyson via  knockout in the first round.
 Light Middleweight bout:   Javier Molina vs.  Danny Figueroa
Molina defeated Figueroa via unanimous decision.
 Light Welterweight bout:   Ty Barnett vs.  Andrey Klimov
Klimov defeated Tyson via technical knockout at 1:12 in the third round.
 Super Flyweight bout:   Matthew Villanueva vs.  Frank Gutierrez
Villanueva defeated Gutierrez via technical knockout at 1:12 in the first round.
 Light Middleweight bout:   Arman Ovsepyan vs.  Arthur Brambila
Ovsepyan defeated Brambila via technical knockout at 2:44 in the first round.

The Fight
Ward started out slow with Abraham, trying to find a way to penetrate his tight defense. After a competitive first few rounds, Ward seized control of the fight, using his ring savvy and instincts to control Abraham. Although Abraham was somewhat passive at times, he gave an earnest effort and frequently threw combinations that were mostly blocked by Ward. Abraham hurt Ward a couple of times in the final round, but it wasn't enough to finish Ward, who won a lopsided unanimous decision.

International broadcasting

References

External links
 Ward vs. Abraham Official Fight Card from BoxRec

Boxing matches
2011 in boxing
Boxing in California
Sports competitions in Carson, California
2011 in sports in California
May 2011 sports events in the United States